The Golden Calf is a 1968 Soviet comedy film directed by Mikhail Schweitzer, based on the eponymous novel by Ilf and Petrov.

Cast
 Sergei Yursky as Ostap Bender
 Leonid Kuravlyov as Shura Balaganov
 Zinovy Gerdt as Mikhail Samuelevich Panikovsky
 Yevgeny Yevstigneyev as Koreiko
 Svetlana Starikova as Zosya Sinitskaya
 Nikolai Boyarsky as Adam Kozlevich
 Igor Yasulovich as young driver
 Nikolai Sergeyev as old man Sinitsky, Zosya's grandfather
 Tamara Syomina as Rayechka
 Pavel Pavlenko as Chairman Funt
 Igor Kashintsev as servant Bomze (uncredited)
 Mikhail Kokshenov as the secretary (uncredited)

External links

1968 films
Mosfilm films
Soviet black-and-white films
Films based on Russian novels
Films directed by Mikhail Shveytser
Films set in the 1920s
Films set in Moscow
Films set in Odesa
Films set in the Soviet Union
Films shot in Moscow
Films shot in Odesa
Films shot in Turkmenistan
Films shot in Vladimir Oblast
Ilf and Petrov
1960s crime comedy films
Soviet crime comedy films
Russian crime comedy films
1968 comedy films
Russian black-and-white films